Where Others Keep Silent is a 1984 East German drama film directed by Ralf Kirsten. It was entered into the 14th Moscow International Film Festival.

Cast
 Gudrun Okras as Clara Zetkin
 Elke Reuter as Christa
 Rolf Ludwig as Gustav
 Klaus Manchen as John Schehr
 Klaus Piontek as Maxim
 Günter Junghans as Jürgen
 Dieter Bellmann as Erich
 Hans-Uwe Bauer as Fritz
 Bernd-Uwe Reppenhagen as Klaus
 Manfred Zetzsche as Nazi-Führer

References

External links
 

1984 films
1980s historical films
German historical films
East German films
1980s German-language films
Films set in 1932
Biographical films about revolutionaries
Films set in Berlin
1980s German films